The first Judges of the African Court on Human and Peoples' Rights were elected on January 22, 2006 at the Eighth Ordinary Session of the Executive Council of the African Union, held in Khartoum, Sudan.  The judges, hailing from 11 of the 53 member states of the African Union, are from varying backgrounds of judicial experience and knowledge of international and human rights law.

Each judge serves for a six-year term, and can be re-elected once. The President and Vice-President  are elected to two-year terms and can only be re-elected once.

  Dr. Gerard Niyungeko (President)
  Modibo Tounty Guindo  (Vice-President)
  Dr. Fatsah Ouguergouz
  Jean Emile Somda
  Sophia A.B. Akuffo
  Kellelo Justina Mafoso-Guni
  Hamdi Faraj Fanoush
  Jean Mutsinzi
  El Hadj Guissé
  Bernard Ngoepe
  George W. Kanyeihamba

References

External links 
African Union Website
Project on International Courts and Tribunals
Coalition for an Effective African Court on Human and Peoples' Rights

 
African Union-related lists
African